The fourth competition weekend of the 2014–15 ISU Speed Skating World Cup was held in the Thialf arena in Heerenveen, Netherlands, from Friday, 12 December, until Sunday, 14 December 2014.

Pavel Kulizhnikov of Russia continued his brilliant form from the start of the season by winning three gold medals in the men's competitions; both 500 m races, and the 1000 m race.

In the women's competitions, Heather Richardson and Brittany Bowe made it a "triple double" for the United States by taking gold and silver in three races, the second 500 m, the 1000 m, and the 1500 m.

In the men's 500 m on Friday, Christian Oberbichler of Austria improved his own national record, set only the previous weekend. In the 5000 m race on Saturday, Viktor Hald Torup of Denmark set a new national record, and Nils van der Poel of Sweden set a national junior record.

Schedule
The detailed schedule of events:

All times are CET (UTC+1).

Medal summary

Men's events

 In mass start, race points are accumulated during the race. The skater with most race points is the winner.

Women's events

 In mass start, race points are accumulated during the race. The skater with most race points is the winner.

References

 
4
Isu World Cup, 2014-15, 4
ISU Speed Skating World Cup, 2014-15, World Cup 4